The 2019 Kyalami 9 Hours was an endurance event that took place on 23 November 2019 at the Kyalami Grand Prix Circuit in Midrand, South Africa. This event served as a revival to the Kyalami 9 Hours event which was last held in 2000, and also served as the final race of the 2019 Intercontinental GT Challenge.

The race was won from pole by  Frikadelli Racing Team and drivers Nick Tandy, Dennis Olsen and Mathieu Jaminet. Frikadelli's #31 Porsche 911 GT3 R finished 6.745 seconds ahead of Walkenhorst Motorsport and their #34 BMW M6 GT3 shared by Mikkel Jensen, Nicky Catsburg and Christian Krognes. GPX Racing secured third place a further 2.290 seconds down, in their #20 Porsche 911 GT3 R driven by Kevin Estre, Richard Lietz and Michael Christensen.

Entry list

Qualifying

Pole Shootout
These were the 10 fastest cars in qualifying

Race

Race Results

Notes
  - The #12 Dinamic Motorsport car was awarded a 10-second time penalty after the race.

References

External links
 Official website

Auto races in South Africa
Kyalami
Kyalami